The 2016–17 WHL season is the 51st season of the Western Hockey League (WHL). The regular season began on September 23, 2016 and ended on March 19, 2017.

The playoffs began shortly after the end of the regular season on March 24, 2017, and ended on May 14, 2017; the winning team, the Seattle Thunderbirds, were awarded the Ed Chynoweth Cup and a berth in the 2017 Memorial Cup that was held at the WFCU Centre in Windsor, Ontario from May 19–28, 2017.

The Prince George Cougars won their first BC Division banner.

Standings
Updated to game(s) played on March 19, 2017. Source: Western Hockey League

Note: GP = Games played; W = Wins; L = Losses; OTL = Overtime losses; SL = Shootout losses; GF = Goals for; GA = Goals against; PTS = Points; x = clinched playoff berth; y = clinched division title; z = clinched conference title

Statistical leaders

Scoring leaders 

Players are listed by points, then goals.

Note: GP = Games played; G = Goals; A = Assists; Pts. = Points; PIM = Penalty minutes

Goaltenders 
These are the goaltenders that lead the league in GAA that have played at least 1800 minutes.

Note: GP = Games played; Mins = Minutes played; W = Wins; L = Losses; OTL = Overtime losses; SOL = Shootout losses; SO = Shutouts; GAA = Goals against average; Sv% = Save percentage

2017 WHL playoffs

Conference Quarter-finals

Eastern Conference

(E1) Regina Pats vs. (W2) Calgary Hitmen

(E2) Moose Jaw Warriors vs. (E3) Swift Current Broncos

(C1) Medicine Hat Tigers vs. (W1) Brandon Wheat Kings 

* Note: Games 3 and 4 were played at Credit Union Place in Dauphin due to the Royal Manitoba Winter Fair taking place at the Keystone Centre from March 27 to April 1.

(C2) Lethbridge Hurricanes vs. (C3) Red Deer Rebels

Western Conference

(U1) Everett Silvertips vs. (W2) Victoria Royals

(U2) Seattle Thunderbirds vs. (U3) Tri-City Americans

(B1) Prince George Cougars vs. (W1) Portland Winterhawks

(B2) Kelowna Rockets vs. (B3) Kamloops Blazers

Conference Semi-finals

Eastern Conference

(E1) Regina Pats vs. (E3) Swift Current Broncos

(C1) Medicine Hat Tigers vs. (C2) Lethbridge Hurricanes

Western Conference

(U1) Everett Silvertips vs. (U2) Seattle Thunderbirds

(B2) Kelowna Rockets vs. (W1) Portland Winterhawks

Conference Finals

Eastern Conference

(E1) Regina Pats vs. (C2) Lethbridge Hurricanes

Western Conference

(U2) Seattle Thunderbirds vs. (B2) Kelowna Rockets

WHL Championship

(E1) Regina Pats vs. (U2) Seattle Thunderbirds

Playoff scoring leaders
Note: GP = Games played; G = Goals; A = Assists; Pts = Points; PIM = Penalty minutes

Playoff leading goaltenders
Note: GP = Games played; Mins = Minutes played; W = Wins; L = Losses; GA = Goals Allowed; SO = Shutouts; SV& = Save percentage; GAA = Goals against average

WHL awards

All-Star Teams

Eastern Conference

* - unanimous selection

Western Conference 

* - unanimous selection

See also 
 2017 Memorial Cup
 List of WHL seasons
 2016–17 OHL season
 2016–17 QMJHL season
 2016 in ice hockey
 2017 in ice hockey

References

External links 

 Official website of the Western Hockey League
 Official website of the Canadian Hockey League
 Official website of the MasterCard Memorial Cup
 Official website of the Subway Super Series

Western Hockey League seasons
Whl
WHL